The Women's Freestyle 68 kg is a competition featured at the 2018 European Wrestling Championships, and was held in Kaspiysk, Russia on May 2 and May 3.

Medalists

Results 
 Legend
 F — Won by fall

Main Bracket

Repechage

References

Women's Freestyle 68 kg
2018 in women's sport wrestling